Long Apu is a longhouse in the mountainous interior of the Marudi division of Sarawak, Malaysia.

The village is located on the Baram River and is known for white water rafting events. The people are from the Kenyah. Most of the villagers are dependent on the natural resources to sustain their daily needs, especially for food. They go hunting and cultivate paddy huma. The baram river is one of the main source to gain foods and money. There are a number of other small drainage close to this village which are able to be visited by using boats. If the Baram Dam hydroelectric project goes ahead, Long Apu will be one of the villages affected by the flooding of 389,000 hectares of jungle.

Neighbouring settlements include:

References

Villages in Sarawak